Comerciário Futebol Clube, commonly known as Comerciário, is a Brazilian football club based in São Luís, Maranhão state.

History
The club was founded on January 8, 2003. Ferroviário won the Campeonato Maranhense Second Level in 2004.

Achievements

 Campeonato Maranhense Second Level:
 Winners (1): 2004

Stadium

Comerciário Futebol Clube play their home games at Estádio Nhozinho Santos. The stadium has a maximum capacity of 16,500 people.

References

Football clubs in Maranhão
Association football clubs established in 2003
2003 establishments in Brazil